The Special Tactical Contingent (STC), nicknamed the "Raptors", commonly known as the Special Tactical Squad (STS), is a specialist riot contingent of the Hong Kong Police Force under the command of the Police Tactical Unit (PTU).  

It was created in September 2014 in response to Occupy Movement protests with its main tasks being crowd control and riot control, including when the PTU suffered from heavy blockade or obstruction. Examples were obstacle removal, conducting arrests, providing first aid, etc. 

The STC would also conduct observational and command related tasks, to ensure and review the Police Tactical Unit's use of force and tactics are appropriate, to further improve from past events. 

A report by Amnesty International singled out the Special Tactical Contingent and riot police for "the worst abuses" of excessive force during the 2019-20 protests, noting that "almost every arrested person interviewed described being beaten with batons and fists during the arrest, even when they were not resisting and often already restrained," along with multiple hospitalizations.

History
In response to the Occupy Central Movement the police established the Special Tactical Contingent in September 2014. The media reported that the police had not officially named the contingent commonly known as the Raptors and that instead it was referred to by the police as the Elite Team or Removal Team. On 1 December 2014, the media reported that the contingent had recently been officially named as the Special Tactical Squad by the head of the Police Tactical Unit, however, days later another media outlet reported that this name was used but not official yet. The official English name the Special Tactical Contingent was first used by the police in a police publication in an article in Offbeat newspaper in 2016 and was used again the following year in the 2017 Police Review and in proceeding years. Despite the use of the official name from 2016, protesters and the media continued to use the name Special Tactical Squad for the contingent.

Structure
The contingent is a small unit with members drawn from several permanent units to perform duties on an ad hoc basis under the command of the Police Tactical Unit. Members are drawn from the Police Tactical Unit (PTU) Headquarters, Counter Terrorism Response Unit, Airport Security Unit, Special Duties Unit and the all-female Tango Coy. Contingent members return to their permanent unit after completing ad hoc tasks. The contingent operates in teams of five members with the team leader either the rank of Sergeant or Inspectorate.

Operations

2014 Hong Kong protests

The name of the police operation for the protests was Operation Solarpeak.

2016 Mong Kok Civil Unrest

On 9 February evening, 2016, in an escalation of the civil unrest, protesters changed their tactics, overwhelming the Hong Kong Police Force, and the Special Tactical Contingent were deployed as a result. They arrived at the intersection of Soy Street and Sai Yeung Choi Street South at 4:30 am, where they quickly cleared protesters. However, after 5 minutes, due to the lack of reinforcements, they were forced to retreat, with one constable injured.

2016 Anti-Interpretation Protest
Protests were held from 6 to 8 November 2016 during the interpretation of the Basic Law.

2019 anti extradition bill protests

Squads were deployed to disperse the crowds after clashes between the protesters and the police started. During some of the protests in August, protesters threw Molotov cocktails, bricks, metal pipes etc., and the squads deployed tear gas canisters, rubber bullet, beanbag rounds to disperse them. Live-fire weapons were also deployed. Many of the officers were accused for using excessive force during arrests and while dispersing the protesters. Most notably during the 2019 Prince Edward station attack and the siege of the Hong Kong Polytechnic University. Apple Daily and New Tang Dynasty Television reported that SDU operators disguised as protesters provoked fights with protestors in order for them to be arrested. Newtalk reported that SDU operators disguised as protestors committed illegal acts such as setting fire on the street as part of a false flag operation.

Uniform
Officers initially wore a dark blue PTU uniform. Each officer attached a team call-sign with velcro to the back of their helmet for example “3-1”. There was no Force requirement for a STC member to attach their service number or rank to their uniform although some officers did.

During the 2016 Mong Kok civil unrest, the police found that the PTU uniform was not suitable for the contingent. A new black uniform together with protective armor was sourced from overseas in November 2016 and approved in January 2017. The new uniform was first used in operations on 9 June 2019. There was no requirement to attach their service number to their uniform although some officers attached it. From 28 June 2019, each officer attached to their helmet, in addition to the team call-sign, a sticker with a letter known as a Alpha ID to identify individual members of the team for example letters “a” to “e” if the team consists of 5 members. The Alpha ID was not unique to the officer and would be returned if an officer was no longer assigned to the STC and reissued to another officer.

In November 2020, the High Court found that the failure of the Commissioner of Police to establish and maintain a system to ensure that each police officer could be uniquely identified and that officers wear and prominently display a unique identification number or mark violated Article 3 of the Hong Kong Bill of Rights.

Officers attached a fluorescent stick (including yellow or red colours, depending on their team) to their helmet at night time for easier recognition by a commanding officer.

Equipment

Medical
 First Aid Kit
 Space Blanket
 Spinal Board

Riot Control
 Riot Helmets
 Ops-Core FAST XP High Cut helmets (SDU)
 MSA MO 5001 (Patrol Officers)
 Team Wendy Exfil LTP
 Ops-Core FAST Bump
 Riot Visors/Goggles
 Gas Masks - British Avon SF10, Canadian C4, AVON FM53 (PTU, CTRU), Scott FRR (SDU) 
 5.11 tactical VTAC LBE vests, BLACKHAWK S.T.R.I.K.E. Omega
 MSA Paraclete RMV plate carriers (Worn by SDU operators)
 Crye Precision JPC plate carriers
 Anti-cut Gloves, uses 3M materials, used to carry and remove obstacles.
 Fire Protective Gloves
 Riot Gloves
 Tactical Boots
 Cable Tie
 Handcuffs

Lethal and Less-Than-Lethal Deterrents
 Smith & Wesson Model 10 Heavy Barrel (Used by officers from patrol units, EU and PTU)
 Glock 17 (Used by operators from SDU, CTRU and ASU)
 Remington Model 870
 H&K MP5A3, MP5A5 (Used by operators from SDU, CTRU and ASU)
 AR-15 (Used by PTU officers)
 SIG Sauer SIG516 (Used by SDU and CTRU operators)
 Pepper Spray/OC Spray
 Sabre Red Pepper Spray (Mk. 3 & Mk. 9 Models)
 Riot Specialized Pepper Spray
 Pepper-spray projectile
 VKS Pepperball Launcher
 OC Water Jet Pack, in the ratio of 350mL of OC Liquid to 14L of pure water, within a container, carried on the back or placed on the ground, far distance and accurate spray.
 OC grenade (UK N225 & CHN KF-302-20)
 37/38mm Federal Riot Gun
 NonLethal Technologies™ MP-6M5-CS /Model CS-565 Tear Gas rounds, 5 rounds per projectile, able to discharge at 50–70 meters.
 NonLethal Technologies™ MP-4-R3 /Model 373 Rubber Baton rounds, 3 rounds per projectile, able to discharge at 40–50 meters.
 Norinco NF01-3 Tear Gas rounds, 3 rounds per projectile, able to discharge at 50–70 meters.
 ARWEN 37 Multiple-Shot Less Lethal Launcher (Used by SDU operators)
 Penn Arms GL-1 Compact（L140-4) Less Lethal Launcher
 M320 Grenade Launcher Module
 Batons
 21-inch ASP Extendable Baton 
 18-inch PPCT Phoenix Extendable Baton 
 Riot Truncheon

Others
 3M Peltor Comtac/MSA Sordin/Ops-Core AMP Headset (worn by SDU operators)
 Megaphone
 Wire Cutters
 Electric Drill
 Mobile Platform, 4 officers are in charge of protecting and pushing the platform, alongside 2 officers on the platform to observe, conduct forensic filming, announce, command, etc.

See also
 Police Tactical Unit (Hong Kong)
 Special Duties Unit

References

Hong Kong Police Force
Special forces of Hong Kong